Faisal Islam (born 29 May 1977) is a British political and economics journalist who is the economics editor of BBC News and the occasional presenter of Newsnight. He was the political editor of Sky News from 2014 to 2019, and from May 2004 was business correspondent and later economics editor of Channel 4 News until June 2014.

Early life and education
Born on 29 May 1977 to Bengali parents from West Bengal, India. Faisal Islam  was brought up in Didsbury, Manchester. He was educated at The Manchester Grammar School, an independent school in Manchester, followed by Trinity College, Cambridge. In 2000, he gained a post-graduate diploma in newspaper journalism from City University in London.

Career
Islam was formerly an economics correspondent for The Observer newspaper. He became business correspondent for Channel 4 News in May 2004, later becoming its economics editor, a position he held until 1 June 2014, when he was replaced by Paul Mason, the programme's former culture and media editor.

Islam has reported on the ups and downs of the corporate world from government-subsidised arms dealers and failing PFI contracts to how bankers are trading weather. Islam was named as successor to the long-serving political editor Adam Boulton of Sky News; he took up his new post before the Scottish independence referendum took place in September 2014. Boulton then presented a mid-morning news programme, All Out Politics, on the same channel.

In November 2018 it was announced that he would replace Kamal Ahmed as BBC News's economics editor, effective summer 2019. He was replaced at Sky News in his role as political editor by Beth Rigby, previously the deputy political editor.

Since 2020 Islam has occasionally presented editions of Newsnight when the show's regular presenters have been unavailable.

Awards and nominations
In 2000, Islam was awarded the Wincott Award for Young Financial Journalist of the Year, and shortlisted for Young Journalist of the Year at the British Press Awards for 2001.

In February 2006, Islam was named Young Journalist of the Year at the Royal Society of Television awards.

In January 2007, Islam was the winner of the year's Broadcast News Journalism Award at the Workworld Media Awards.

In May 2009, Islam received the Wincott Foundation's award for Best Television Coverage of a Topical Issue, won particularly for his work on the growing financial problems of the Icelandic banks. The judges said of the report "...here was something really new, completely convincing, with a stellar interview and free of many of the visual clichés which characterised too many financial programmes." In 2009, he was awarded the Business Journalist of the Year, as well as the BJOYA award for Best Broadcast Story – again for his report on the Icelandic banks.

In January 2010, Islam was named Broadcast News Reporter of the Year by the WorkWorld Foundation for 2009, with the judges saying "his excellent writing converts abstract economics to something accessible to all, informing viewers in a compelling and original way."

In January 2015, Islam was nominated for the Services to Media award at the British Muslim Awards.

In March 2017, he won the Royal Television Society award for the Interview of the Year for his interview with Prime Minister David Cameron.

In September 2019, he won the Asian Achiever's Award for outstanding Achievement in Media, Arts & Culture.

Articles

References

External links

Images of Faisal Islam

1977 births
Living people
Alumni of City, University of London
Alumni of Trinity College, Cambridge
Channel 4 people
English people of Bengali descent
English people of Indian descent
English television journalists
People educated at Manchester Grammar School
People from Didsbury
ITN newsreaders and journalists
Sky News newsreaders and journalists
Journalists from Manchester
21st-century Bengalis